Guillermo Maldonado (born October 29, 1952 in Buenos Aires Province), is an Argentine racing driver. He started his career in the late 70s and retired after 1996.

He won the Fórmula Two Argentina championship 1980 and 1982, the four editions of the Formula Two Codasur championship (from 1983 to 1986) and the TC2000 championship in 1994. Raced at the 1983 24 Hours of Daytona.

References

1952 births
Living people
Argentine racing drivers
Formula 3 Sudamericana drivers
TC 2000 Championship drivers